Scrapbook EP  is a double 7-inch single and CD EP by the band Portastatic. It was released on the Merge Records label in 1995.

"St. Elmo's Fire" is a Brian Eno cover. "Why Pinch Yourself" and "A Bear That Chokes" were previously released on Hello CD of the Month EP.

Yo La Tengo appears on the EP.

Critical reception
AllMusic wrote that the EP "is the sort of work that sets a blueprint for things to come ...  the record is fantastic in every respect." Spin called the version of "St. Elmo's Fire" a "stunner ... which sounds like a '70s country-rock tune piped into a truckstop diner in cyberspace."

Track listing 

Double 7":		

Side A:
 "St. Elmo's Fire"

Side B:
 "Why Pinch Yourself"

Side C:
 "A Bear That Chokes"

Side D:
 "My Favourite Sound"

CD EP:
 "St. Elmo's Fire"
 "Why Pinch Yourself"
 "A Bear That Chokes"
 "My Favourite Sound"

Personnel
Mac McCaughan
Georgia Hubley "St. Elmo's Fire"
Ira Kaplan "St. Elmo's Fire"

References 

1995 EPs
Merge Records EPs
Portastatic albums